Windy is a 1968 studio album by Astrud Gilberto, arranged by Eumir Deodato, Don Sebesky, and Patrick Williams.

Reception

The AllMusic review by Jason Ankney awarded the album three and a half stars and said that the album "proves one of Astrud Gilberto's most consistent and sublime efforts, artfully straddling the division between Brazilian bossa nova and American sunshine pop...the songs possess a lithe, shimmering beauty that perfectly complements Gilberto's feathery vocals". Ankeny reserves criticism for "the cloying sweetness that undermines so many of her mid-period Verve LPs", highlighting the duet with her son Marcelo on "The Bare Necessities".

Track listing
 "Dreamy" (Luiz Bonfá) - 2:05
 "Chup, Chup, I Got Away" (Marcos Valle) - 2:09
 "Never My Love" (Don and Dick Addrisi) - 2:53
 "Lonely Afternoon" (Robert Maxwell, Patrick Williams) - 3:25
 "On My Mind" (Eumir Deodato, Norman Gimbel) - 2:44
 "The Bare Necessities" (Terry Gilkyson) - 2:37
 "Windy" (Ruthann Friedman) - 2:49
 "Sing Me a Rainbow" (Estelle Levitt, Lou Stallman) - 2:11
 "In My Life" (John Lennon, Paul McCartney) - 2:29
 "Crickets Sing for Anamaria" (Marcos Valle) - 1:36
 "Where Are They Now?" (Bradford Craig, Ty Whitney) - 3:11

Personnel
Astrud Gilberto - vocals
Marcelo Gilberto - vocals on "The Bare Necessities"
Patrick Williams - arranger, conductor (on track 4)
Eumir Deodato - arranger, conductor (on tracks 1, 2, 5 and 7)
Don Sebesky - arranger, conductor (on tracks 3, 6, 8, 9 and 11)
Production
Acy Lehman - art direction
Howard Terpening - cover art
Val Valentin - director, director of engineering
Phil Ramone - engineer
Dave Sanders
Diane Judge - liner notes
Pete Spargo - Record producer
David Greene - remixing

References

1968 albums
Bossa nova albums
Astrud Gilberto albums
Albums arranged by Don Sebesky
Albums arranged by Eumir Deodato
Verve Records albums